{{Infobox enzyme
| Name = Anthocyanin 3-O-glucoside 6-O-hydroxycinnamoyltransferase
| EC_number = 
| CAS_number = 
| IUBMB_EC_number = 
| GO_code = 
| image = 
| width = 
| caption = 
}}
Anthocyanin 3-O-glucoside 6″-O-hydroxycinnamoyltransferase is an enzyme forming delphinidin 3-(6-p-coumaroyl)glucoside from delphinidin 3-O-glucoside (myrtillin) and p-coumaroyl-CoA.

It is an enzyme in the anthocyanin biosynthesis pathway.

It can be isolated from Perilla frutescens''.

References

External links 
 Sequence at uniprot.org

Transferases
Anthocyanins metabolism